Mark Haworth-Booth  (born 20 August 1944) is a British academic and historian of photography. He was a curator at the Victoria & Albert Museum in London from 1970 to 2004.

Family

His family on his father’s side were minor gentry seated at Hull Bank House, Kingston upon Hull Yorkshire, now Haworth Hall. One of his forebears married the sister of the poet and MP for Hull, Andrew Marvell.

Early life and education
Haworth-Booth was the youngest son of Alderman Antony Haworth-Booth, chairman of East Sussex County Council, and Eva Holm, only daughter of the Danish stage and film actress Astrid Holm and her husband Holger Holm, ballet dancer and film actor. 

He was educated at Brighton College before going up to Clare College, Cambridge to read English literature, before undertaking postgraduate studies in Art history at the University of Edinburgh and (much later) creative writing at Exeter (MA with Distinction).

Work
Haworth-Booth started his career at the Manchester Art Gallery in 1969 and worked at the Victoria and Albert Museum from 1970 to 2004, becoming Senior Curator of Photographs and played a major role in building up its collection of photography. He has curated many exhibitions, including Photography: An Independent Art (1997), and Things: A Spectrum of Photography, 1850–2001 (2004). The last photography exhibition he curated, with the Galerie nationale du Jeu de Paume in Paris and the National Portrait Gallery, London, was a centenary retrospective of the pioneering photographer Camille Silvy (1834–1910). It was titled Camille Silvy. Photographer of Modern Life 1834–1910 and exhibited at the National Portrait Gallery in 2010. He researched the Silvy Exhibition catalogue at the J. Paul Getty Museum, Los Angeles, as a Museum Scholar in 2008.

Inaugural Visiting Professor of Photography at the University of the Arts London (2002–2009), he acted as a consultant on the BBC television series The Genius of Photography, aired in 2007 and again in 2009.

Since retiring from most photographic activity he has focused on environmental campaigning and writing. He has published poems in national magazines since 1986, won awards and published two books of poems: Wild Track (2005) and Wild is the Wind (with Tessa Traeger’s photographs, 2017).

Personal life
Haworth-Booth lives in North Devon with his wife Rosie (née Miles), whom he married in 1979. Rosemary Miles (her professional name) made many important acquisitions of BAME printmakers for the V&A collection and served as the chair of Autograph, the Association of Black Photographers. They have two daughters.

Honours

2005: OBE, for "services to museums".

Academic awards
1987: Hood Medal, Royal Photographic Society
1996: Hon FRPS, Royal Photographic Society
2005: Honorary Research Fellow, Victoria & Albert Museum (V&A)
2006: Fenton Award, Royal Photographic Society
2006: Senior Fellow of the Royal College of Art
2012: Honorary Doctor of Arts, University of the Arts (Hon DA)

Publications

With essays by 
 
  (Essay: Homage to mount desert island : a small resort, but there's so much to do)
  (Essay: Benjamin Brecknell Turner : Photographic views from nature)
  (Preface)
  (Essay: San Quentin Point)
  (Essay: A Connoisseur of the art of photography in the 1850s: The Rev. C. H. Townsend)
  (Essay: Photography and the new vision)
  (Essay: Reyner Banham and photography)
  (Essay: Camille Silvy : the photography of works of art as record and restoration)
  (Essay: The Return of Vittorio Sella)
  (Essay Roger Fenton, Double Bridge on the Machno)(Essay Bill Brandt, Young Housewife, Bethnal Green, 1937)

Collections
Haworth-Booth's work is held in the following permanent collection:
National Portrait Gallery, London: 18 Polaroid prints (as of June 2020)

See also
 Adrian Hardy Haworth

Arms

References

External links

1944 births
Living people
Alumni of Clare College, Cambridge
Alumni of the University of Edinburgh
Alumni of the University of Exeter
Mark Haworth-Booth
British curators
Historians of photography
Officers of the Order of the British Empire
People educated at Brighton College
People from North Devon (district)
Photography curators
Photography in the United Kingdom